Nectriaster monacanthus is a species of sea star in the family Orestieridae. It is the sole species in the genus Nectriaster. It was first described by Hubert Lyman Clark in 1916 as Mediaster monacanthus.

References

Oreasteridae
Animals described in 1916
Taxa named by Hubert Lyman Clark